Wu Zhongwei (born 10 December 1995) is a Chinese para-snowboarder who competes in the SB-LL1 category.

Career
He represented China at the 2022 Winter Paralympics and won a gold medal in the banked slalom and a bronze medal in the snowboard cross event.

References 

1995 births
Living people
Chinese male snowboarders
Paralympic snowboarders of China
Snowboarders at the 2022 Winter Paralympics
Medalists at the 2022 Winter Paralympics
Paralympic medalists in snowboarding
Paralympic gold medalists for China
Paralympic bronze medalists for China
21st-century Chinese people